An Ice cream cart (a.k.a. Ice cream stall) is a mobile non-motorized commercial vehicle that sells ice cream as a retail outlet. The Ice cream cart is usually used during the summer and is generally spotted at public space, parks, beaches, schools or drive through neighborhoods (residential areas). Sometimes a bicycle is attached to the cart, in order to improve its mobility.

Around the World

Singapore 
These are available in three forms: it can be served in a cup, sandwiched in a folded slice of bread – pandan or rainbow bread – or between two thin wafer biscuits.

The ice cream flavours that are usually sold around town are: chocolate chip, durian, raspberry ripple, chocolate, yam, mango, red bean and sweet corn. Other flavours include blueberry, mocha chip, peppermint chocolate chip, nata de coco, matcha, strawberry, cheese, caramel, avocado, cappucino and more.

The carts are run by Singapore's pioneer generation and they are generally found in crowded public areas such as the outside of The Cathay and many spots along Orchard Road and Bugis.

Philippines 
Sorbetero

See also

 Ice cream van

References 

Commercial vehicles
Food trucks
Ice cream
Street culture
Restaurants by type